Antidesma puncticulatum, known as mao luang, is a species of plant in the family Phyllanthaceae. It was previously classified as a genus within family Euphorbiaceae, but later moved into family Phyllanthaceae. It is native to South Asia and South-east Asian countries.

References

 Philippine plants
 jstor.org
 In vitro culturing

Flora of Sri Lanka
puncticulatum